Lojo may refer to:
Lohja (Finnish) or Lojo (Swedish), town and municipality in Finland
Lo'Jo, French band active 1982–present